is a former Japanese football player.  Fujii previously played for Júbilo Iwata and Ehime FC

Club statistics

References

External links

football news

1986 births
Living people
Association football people from Aichi Prefecture
Japanese footballers
J1 League players
J2 League players
J3 League players
Japan Football League players
Júbilo Iwata players
Ehime FC players
AC Nagano Parceiro players
Blaublitz Akita players
FC Ryukyu players
Hong Kong First Division League players
Shatin SA players
Sun Hei SC players
Japanese expatriate footballers
Japanese expatriate sportspeople in Hong Kong
Expatriate footballers in Hong Kong
Association football forwards